South Galson is a settlement on the northwest coast of the Isle of Lewis in the Western Isles of Scotland. It is 11 km southwest of Port of Ness. The Galson Primary School closed in 1996. The populations of North Galson, South Galson, and Melbost were 149 in 1999.

History 
The village was a crofting village until 1863, after which the inhabitants of North Galson, South Galson and Melbost Galson were cleared to make way for a new farm.  

The farm was occupied by tenants until 1921, when crofters began to lobby for land reform. The crofters had been promised land in return for fighting in the First World War, but that promise was not kept. As a result of this broken promise a number of ex-soldiers and others began to raid the Galson Farm and to campaign for the farm to be broken up into new crofts. In 1923, the government divided the farm into 53 crofts. All the buildings in Galson, except for the farmhouse and its steadings, have been built since 1923.

Eventually, in 2007, after a community buyout, the land was handed over to Galson Estate Trust.

Urras Oighreachd Ghabhsainn / Galson Estate Trust 
Urras Oighreachd Ghabhsainn was established in 2007 to manage the Galson Estate on behalf of the community. The 56,000-acre estate comprises 22 villages running from Upper Barvas to Port of Ness with a population of nearly 2,000 people. The development of the wind turbines at Ballantrushal and commercial developments provide the trust with an income stream. The trust's headquarters is located in South Galson. In 2019 the building caught fire. A new headquarters was under construction in 2021.

Teampall a’ Chrò’ Naomh 
Teampall a’ Chrò’ Naomh (Chapel  of  the  Holy Cross) is a church situated in South Galson old cemetery. William Daniell made a painting of the chapel in 1819 that shows the building intact, but it is now a ruin. The church is a scheduled monument.

References

External links 
Canmore Photos

Villages in the Isle of Lewis